The 13th Indian Infantry Brigade was an Infantry formation of the Indian Army during World War II. The brigade was formed in October 1940, at Campbellpore and assigned to the 7th Indian Infantry Division. It was transferred to the 1st Burma Division in July 1941, and after the withdrawal to India renamed the 113th Indian Infantry Brigade in June 1942. In August 1943, the brigade became a dedicated jungle warfare training brigade until the end of the war.

Formation

13th Indian Infantry Brigade
1st Battalion, 18th Royal Garhwal Rifles  October 1940 to June 1942
2nd Battalion, 7th Rajput Regiment  October 1940 to March 1942
5th Battalion, 1st Punjab Regiment  October 1940 to March 1942
1st Battalion, Royal Inniskilling Fusiliers  April to June 1942
5th Battalion, 1st Punjab Regiment  April to June 1942
12th Battalion, Burma Rifles  April to May 1942

113th Indian Infantry Brigade
1st Battalion, 18th Royal Garhwal Rifles  June 1942 to August 1943
2nd Battalion, King's Own Yorkshire Light Infantry June 1942 to July 1943
5th Battalion, 1st Punjab Regiment  June 1942 to August 1943 
2nd Battalion, 13th Frontier Force Rifles April to August 1943	 
29th Gurkha Rifles Training Battalion  from August 1943
7th Battalion, 9th Jat Regiment  from August 1943
7th Battalion, 12th Frontier Force Regiment  from September 1943
17/18 Combined Training Unit  from October 1943
Indian State Forces Training Unit  From December 1943

See also

 List of Indian Army Brigades in World War II

References

British Indian Army brigades
Military units and formations of Burma in World War II
Military units and formations established in 1939
Military units and formations disestablished in 1945